Healthcare in Taiwan is administered by the Ministry of Health and Welfare of the Executive Yuan. As with other developed economies, Taiwanese people are well-nourished but face such health problems as chronic obesity and heart disease. In 2002 Taiwan had nearly 1.6 physicians and 5.9 hospital beds per 1,000 population. In 2002, there were 36 hospitals and 2,601 clinics in the country. Per capita health expenditures totaled US$752 in 2000. Health expenditures constituted 5.8 percent of the gross domestic product (GDP) in 2001 (or US$951 in 2009); 64.9 percent of the expenditures were from public funds. Overall life expectancy in 2019 was averaged at 81 years.

Recent major health issues include the SARS crisis in 2003, though the island was later declared safe by the World Health Organization (WHO).

National Health Insurance

The current healthcare system in Taiwan, known as National Health Insurance (NHI), was instituted in 1995. NHI is a single-payer compulsory social insurance plan that centralizes the disbursement of healthcare funds. The system promises equal access to healthcare for all citizens, and the population coverage had reached 99% by the end of 2004. NHI is mainly financed through premiums, which are based on the payroll tax, and is supplemented with out-of-pocket payments and direct government funding. In the initial stage, fee-for-service predominated for public and private providers. Most health providers operate in the private sector and form a competitive market on the health delivery side. However, many healthcare providers took advantage of the system by offering unnecessary services to a larger number of patients and then billing the government. In the face of increasing loss and the need for cost containment, NHI changed the payment system from fee-for-service to a global budget, a kind of prospective payment system, in 2002.

The implementation of universal healthcare created fewer health disparities for lower-income citizens in Taiwan. Additionally, life expectancy increased more in health class groups that had higher mortality rates before national health insurance was introduced. Life expectancy in Taiwan is about 80 years old as of 2018. Infant mortality rate is low and only 4 deaths for 1,000 live births as well as fertility rates are very high and stable. Taiwan has shifted its approach to allow its country to set structures and functions for other countries to follow. Although there are many different people to tend to including the disabled, Taiwan has catered to its best ability and also supported more than 23.4 million citizens to provide this universal healthcare.

History
Modern medicine only reached Taiwan after the Japanese invasion in 1895. Disease was one of the biggest challenges faced by the Japanese in their early years on Taiwan, a Japanese Prince who was part of the invasion force died of malaria. The Japanese introduced western medicine and modern sanitation practices. The introduction of water purification plants reduced the spread of cholera and other diseases. Communicable disease was a major issue, a plague outbreak lasted from 1898 to 1918. Malaria was reduced through the draining of wetlands and the clearing of bamboo forests.

Following the retreat of the KMT to Taiwan healthcare consisted of a mix of Japanese era institutions and military/veterans institutions which the KMT brought with them along with 1.5 million troops and civilians. Healthcare continued to be almost entirely a government concern until the 1970s when a number of Taiwan’s leading industrial groups opened hospitals.

In July 2013, the Department of Health was restructured as the Ministry of Health and Welfare.

Healthcare reform

Taiwan started its health reform in the 1980s after experiencing two decades of economic growth.

In 1987, the government did away with the martial law that mobilized the governmental departments. The government set up a planning commission and studied other countries' healthcare systems. Taiwan looked at more than ten countries and combined their best qualities to form their own unique system. Healthcare bills were fast-tracked through the Legislative Yuan between 1993 and 1994.

On 1 March 1995, Taiwan formed the National Health Insurance (NHI) model, following the passage of the National Health Insurance Act on 19 July 1994. In a 2009 interview, Michael Chen, vice president and CFO of Taiwan's National Health Insurance Bureau explained that one of the models investigated was the United States and that fundamentally, NHI "is modeled after Medicare [in the USA]. And there are so many similarities — other than that our program covers all of the population, and Medicare covers only the elderly. It seems the way to go to have social insurance."

NHI delivers universal coverage offered by a government-run insurer, covering outpatient visits, inpatient care, dental care, traditional Chinese medicine, renal dialysis, and prescription drugs. The working population pays premiums split with their employers; others pay a flat rate with government help and the poor or veterans are fully subsidized. There are no financial barriers to receiving the medical care required by an individual. That way, Taiwan's citizens are less prone to bankruptcy as a result of medical bills, according to Hongjen Chang, one of the architects of the system.

Under this model, citizens have free range to choose hospitals and physicians without using a gatekeeper and do not have to worry about waiting lists. NHI offers a comprehensive benefit package that covers preventive medical services, prescription drugs, dental services, Chinese medicine, home nurse visits and many more. Working people do not have to worry about losing or changing their jobs because they will not lose their insurance. Since NHI, the previously uninsured have increased their usage of medical services. Most preventive services are free such as annual checkups and maternal and child care. Regular office visits have co-payments as low as US$5 per visit. Co-payments are fixed and unvaried by the person's income.

By 2001, 97 percent of the population were enrolled in the program. Every enrollee has a Health IC smart card. This credit-card-size card contains 32 kilobytes of memory that includes provider and patient profiles to identify and reduce insurance fraud, overcharges, duplication of services and tests. The physician puts the card into a reader and the patient's medical history and prescriptions come up on a computer screen. The insurer is billed the medical bill, and it is automatically paid. Taiwan's single-payer insurer monitors standards, use and quality of treatment for diagnosis by requiring the providers to submit a full report every 24 hours. This improves quality of treatment, limits physicians from over-prescribing medications, and keeps patients from abusing the system.

Patients have largely been satisfied with the system, with satisfaction rates consistently reaching 80% in recent years. However, doctors have been more dissatisfied because fee premiums are controlled as well as selection of services provided under the system. Also, doctors could be heavily penalized for a wide variety of reasons such as seeing too many patients or offering too many services even if patients and services were valid. Even so, patients' satisfaction has been in the 70 percent range. This system has led to protests by healthcare providers. At the beginning of 2006, satisfaction decreased to the mid-60 percent range because the program needed more money to cover its services. Since then, satisfaction has gone back to the 70 percent range. Enrollees are satisfied with more equal access to healthcare, have greater financial risk protection and have equity in healthcare financing.

Taiwan has the lowest administration cost in the world of 2 percent. Before NHI, Taiwan spent 4.7 to 4.8 percent on healthcare. A year after NHI, it increased spending to 5.39 percent. Before NHI, the average annual rate of increase every year was around 13 percent. In 2007, the annual rate of increase is around 5 percent. Taiwan spent a little over 6 percent in GDP and less than US$900 per person.

Facilities and coverage 

, the NHI Facility Contract Distribution facilities total 28,339, including:

Basic coverage areas of the insurance include:

Problems
Even with all their success in their healthcare system, Taiwan has suffered many misfortunes. From 1996 to 2008, the average annual growth rate of expenditures was 5.33%, which outstripped the growth rate of revenue at 4.43%. The revenue base is capped so it does not keep pace with the increase in national income. Premiums are regulated by politicians, and infrequently raised.

There is a low doctor-to-population ratio resulting in too many patients depending on too few doctors. There is also a shortage of nurses. Patients visit the doctor more frequently causing doctors to keep visits to about 2 to 5 minutes per patient. Also, the system is based on a global budget, meaning it has no regard for faculties of risk (surgery, internal medicine, gynaecology, pediatrics, emergency), which affects the medicine, operation and diagnostic tools (X-ray vs. MRI) prescribed.

Due to a decrease in funds available, and with no systems in place to screen patients, all patients will rush to hospitals regardless of terminal patients or general cold, many smaller, but long-serving district hospitals are forced to downscale, or close down and be demolished.

Inequality

Electronic health records 

Taiwan implemented a national electronic health record system beginning with a 3-year plan in 2009.  All residents have a national health insurance card that allows health providers to access their medical information, including visits, prescriptions, and vaccinations.

Nursing

The Ministry of Health and Welfare was in charge of nurses regulation in Taiwan. Nursing was a licensed profession, which provide further of specialist education.

Life expectancy and infant mortality data

See also
 Health in Taiwan
 HIV/AIDS in Taiwan
 Centers for Disease Control (Taiwan)
 Ministry of Health and Welfare (Taiwan)
 National Health Research Institutes
 Health care compared: tabular comparisons of health care in the US, Canada, and other countries not shown above.
 List of hospitals in Taiwan
 Nursing in Taiwan

References

External links

 NHI website
 "Taiwan Takes Fast Track to Universal Health Care" by T.R. Reid, All Things Considered, 15 April 2008.